Taxes in Cyprus are levied by both the central and local governments. Tax revenue stood at 39.2% of GDP in 2012. The most important revenue sources are the income tax, social security, value-added tax and corporate tax, and are all collected by the central government.

Income tax is levied on a progressive rate. Current brackets vary from 0% to 35% in the tax rates for 2014. Furthermore, various tax allowances apply for trade union fees, donation to charities. The tax brackets for the year 2014 are:

Employment income is also subject to various social security contributions. Contributions are subject to a ceiling, for the year 2014 the maximum amount of insurable earnings has been set to €54396 per year. Employees pay 7.8% of their wage and employers contribute 11.5% of the corresponding wage.

Value added tax applies to most sales of goods and services. The standard rate applies at 19% in 2014, up from 17% since 2013. A lower rate of 9% applies to groceries, books and hotel services. The Cyprus VAT is part of the European Union value added tax system. Certain goods and services are exempt from VAT. This includes exports, financial services, rent, etc.

Corporate taxes are levied at a rate of 12.5%. Various deductions apply including interest, cost of buying other companies, and employer's cost to social security.

Anti Tax Avoidance Directive - Transposition to National Law 
On the 19th of July 2019, the Cyprus Department of Taxation has issued a public consultation regarding the national transposition of (EU) 2016/1164 laying down rules against tax avoidance practices that directly affect the functioning of the internal market. In focus of the current consultation is the introduction of Hybrid Mismatch Rules in Cyprus as well as the introduction of an Exit Tax

References

Calculator

Cyprus